Bill Finch may refer to:
Bill Finch (architect) (1913–2003), American architect
Bill Finch (politician), mayor of Bridgeport, Connecticut and former Connecticut State Senator

See also
William Finch (disambiguation)